Until 1 January 2007 Bov municipality was a municipality (Danish, kommune) in South Jutland County on the Jutland peninsula in south Denmark.  The municipality covered an area of 148 km2, and had a total population of 9,992 (2005). Its last mayor was Jens Aage Helmig, a member of the Venstre (Liberal Party) political party. The main town and the site of its municipal council was the town of Padborg.

Bov municipality ceased to exist as the result of Kommunalreformen ("The Municipality Reform" of 2007). It was merged with former Lundtoft, Rødekro, Tinglev,  and Aabenraa municipalities to form the new Aabenraa municipality.  This created a municipality with an area of 951 km2 and a total population of 60,151 (2005). The new municipality belongs to the new Region of Southern Denmark.

External links

References 

 Municipal statistics: NetBorger Kommunefakta, delivered from KMD aka Kommunedata (Municipal Data)
 Municipal mergers and neighbors: Eniro new municipalities map

Former municipalities of Denmark